The 2013 NCAA Division I baseball tournament began on Friday, May 31, 2013 as part of the 2013 NCAA Division I baseball season.  The 64 team double elimination tournament concluded with the 2013 College World Series in Omaha, Nebraska, which began on June 15 and ended with the final round on June 25. The UCLA Bruins swept the Mississippi State Bulldogs in a best-of-three series to win the NCAA National Championship, the university's first in baseball and the 109th national title in all sports.

The 64 participating college baseball teams were selected from an eligible pool of 298 NCAA Division I programs. Thirty teams were awarded an automatic bid as champions of their individual conferences. Additionally, 34 non-automatic qualifying teams were awarded at-large berths by the NCAA Division I Baseball Committee.

The 64 teams were divided into sixteen regionals consisting of four teams each.  All four teams, in each regional, competed in a double-elimination tournament.  Regional champions then faced one another in a best-of-three games series in their individual Super Regional based upon a predetermined bracketed system. This format determined the final eight participants to advance to the College World Series in Omaha, Nebraska.

Fourteen of the sixteen original Regional hosts advanced to their respective Super Regional; the exceptions were the #8 national seed Oregon Ducks and the Virginia Tech Hokies.

For the first time in television history, ESPN provided live cut-ins and highlights from all 16 Regionals with the new Bases Loaded platform — similar to ESPN Goal Line and Buzzer Beater for college football and basketball.

Bids

Automatic bids

By conference

National seeds
These eight teams automatically host a Super Regional if they advance to that round. Oregon was the only team not to advance to the Super Regional.Bold indicates CWS participant.
 North Carolina
 Vanderbilt
 Oregon State
 LSU
 Cal State Fullerton
 Virginia
 Florida State
 Oregon

Regionals and Super Regionals
Bold indicates winner. * indicates extra innings.

Chapel Hill Super Regional

Raleigh Super Regional

Fullerton Super Regional

Baton Rouge Super Regional

Corvallis Super Regional

Charlottesville Super Regional

Tallahassee Super Regional

Nashville Super Regional

College World Series
The College World Series began on June 15, 2013 and was held at TD Ameritrade Park in Omaha, Nebraska.

Participants

Bracket
Seeds listed below indicate national seeds only.

All times Eastern.

Championship Series

Game 1

Game 2

All-Tournament Team
The following players were members of the College World Series All-Tournament Team.

Final standings
Seeds listed below indicate national seeds only

Record by conference

The columns RF, SR, WS, NS, CS, and NC respectively stand for the Regional Finals, Super Regionals, College World Series, National Semifinals, Championship Series, and National Champion.

Tournament notes

Round 1
Virginia Tech was the only #1 seed to be upset by a #4 seed (Connecticut) in its opening game.
Cal Poly and William & Mary recorded their first-ever NCAA tournament wins.
 #3 seeds went 9–7 against #2 seeds in their opening games.

Round 2
After 2 rounds, 14 of the 16 #1 seeds were 2–0 (Virginia Tech & Oregon were 1–1 and knocked into the losers bracket).
Three #4 seeds won elimination games on the 2nd day of the tournament: Central Arkansas, Columbia and Valparaiso.

Regional Finals
Virginia Tech & Oregon were the only #1 seeds not advancing to the Super Regionals.
Central Arkansas was the only #4 seed to reach a regional final (Starkville).
All 4 teams which came from the losers' bracket and won to force an extra game, lost the 2nd game and failed to advance.

Super Regionals
Game 2 between NC State and Rice went 17 innings, making it the fourth longest game in NCAA tournament history and the longest ever in the Super Regional round, which dates to 1999.

College World Series
Indiana is the first Big Ten team to participate in the College World Series since 1984 (Michigan).
With Mississippi State's win over Oregon State in the semifinals, it marks the sixth consecutive College World Series in which the Southeastern Conference has fielded a conference member in the finals.
No top 8 national seed reached the CWS Finals for the first time since 2006. In the last four years, UCLA has made two appearances in the Finals and a Pac-12 Conference team has played in the Championship series three times.
 The Finals featured an SEC team against a Pac-10/12 team for the third time in four years. South Carolina defeated UCLA in 2010, and Arizona defeated South Carolina in 2012. Before 2010, teams from those conferences had met in the finals just once (2000).
 David Berg of UCLA set a new NCAA single-season record with his 24th save on June 24, 2013. and made his 51st appearance of the season, becoming the first pitcher in NCAA history to record 50 or more appearances in multiple seasons.
 UCLA won its first NCAA baseball Championship, becoming the third team to win the Championship with a perfect 10–0 record, the first team to allow no more than one run in each game of the series, and the fourth straight team to sweep the CWS Finals.
 All-Tournament Team: Brian Holberton (C), NC; Wes Rea (1B), MSU.; Brett Pirtle (2B), MSU; Colin Moran (3B) NC; Pat Valaika (SS), UCLA; Michael Conforto (OF), OSU; Eric Filia (OF), UCLA; Hunter Renfroe (OF), MSU; Trey Porter (DH), MSU; Adam Plutko (P), UCLA (also the Most Outstanding Player); Nick Vander Tuig (P), UCLA.
 With the 8–0 shutout loss in game two of the finals, Mississippi State becomes the first team in twenty years to be held scoreless in the CWS finals, (Wichita State lost 8–0 to LSU in 1993), and only the sixth team in CWS history to be held scoreless in the finals.
 UCLA tied the Santa Clara CWS record for number of sacrifice bunts at 12, set in 1962. 
 New attendance record was set on June 25 at 27,127.

Media coverage

Radio
NRG Media, in conjunction with Westwood One/NCAA Radio Network, provided nationwide radio coverage of the College World Series, which was streamed online at dialglobalsports.com and broadcast across radio stations throughout the US. Kevin Kugler and John Bishop called all games leading up to the Championship Series. The championship series was called by Kugler and Scott Graham with Ted Emrich acting as field reporter for the first time.

Television
For the first time ever ESPN carried every game from the Regionals, Super Regionals, and College World Series across the ESPN Networks (ESPN, ESPN2, ESPNU, and ESPN3). ESPN also provided Bases Loaded coverage for the Regionals. Bases Loaded was hosted by Dari Nowkhah and Anish Shroff with Kyle Peterson on hand as analysts. Bases Loaded aired the entire time on ESPN3 with select coverage on ESPN2 and ESPNU.

Broadcast assignments

Regionals
Carter Blackburn & Ben McDonald - Nashville, Tennessee
Kevin Dunn & Danny Graves - Manhattan, Kansas
Adam Amin & Rod Delmonico - Tallahassee, Florida
Dave Neal & Chris Burke - Columbia, South Carolina
Clay Matvick & Paul Lo Duca - Fullerton, California
Tom Hart & Mike Rooney - Corvallis, Oregon
Joe Davis & Jay Walker - Starkville, Mississippi
Mike Morgan & Danny Kanell - Louisville, Kentucky
Super Regionals
Dari Nowkhah, Danny Graves, & Danny Kanell - Chapel Hill, North Carolina
Tom Hart & Paul Lo Duca - Raleigh, NC
Mike Patrick, Kyle Peterson, & Kaylee Hartung - Baton Rouge, Louisiana
Carter Blackburn, Nomar Garciaparra, & Jessica Mendoza - Fullerton, California
College World Series
Karl Ravech or Dave O'Brien, Kyle Peterson, & Kaylee Hartung: Afternoons
Mike Patrick, Orel Hershiser, & Jessica Mendoza: Evenings 

Regionals
Jones Angell & John Manual - Chapel Hill, North Carolina
Doug Sherman & Leland Maddox - Baton Rouge, Louisiana
Dave Weekley & John Gregory - Charlottesville, Virginia
Brett Dolan & Randy Flores - Eugene, Oregon
Andrew Sanders & Sean McNally - Raleigh, North Carolina
Trey Bender & Jerry Kindall - Los Angeles, Californian
Mark Neely & Nick Belmonte - Blacksburg, Virginia
Jim Barbar & Randy Ensor - Bloomington, Indiana
Super Regionals
Mike Morgan & Doug Glanville - Tallahassee, Florida
Clay Matvick & Ben McDonald - Charlottesville, Virginia
Dave Neal & Chris Burke - Nashville, Tennessee
Joe Davis, Alex Cora, & Jay Walker - Corvallis, Oregon
College World Series Championship
Mike Patrick, Orel Hershiser, Kyle Peterson, Jessica Mendoza, & Kaylee Hartung

References

NCAA Division I Baseball Championship
NCAA Division I baseball tournament
Tournament